Holliday is an unincorporated community in Tioga County, Pennsylvania, United States.

Unincorporated communities in Tioga County, Pennsylvania
Unincorporated communities in Pennsylvania